Giulio Iellini (born 18 October 1947) is a retired Italian professional basketball player. In 2009, he was inducted into the Italian Basketball Hall of Fame.

Professional career
Iellini won two EuroLeague championships, in 1966 and 1976.

Italian national team
Iellini was a part of the senior Italian national basketball teams that won bronze medals at the 1971 EuroBasket, and the 1975 EuroBasket. He was also on the Italian team that placed fourth at EuroBasket 1977. He also competed at the 1972 Summer Olympic Games, and at the 1976 Summer Olympic Games, and finished in fourth and fifth place, respectively.

References

External links
FIBA Profile
FIBA Europe Profile
Italian League Profile 

1947 births
Living people
Basketball players at the 1972 Summer Olympics
Basketball players at the 1976 Summer Olympics
Olimpia Milano players
Olympic basketball players of Italy
Pallacanestro Varese players
Point guards